The City Square was a public plaza located in the Central Business District (CBD) of Melbourne, Victoria, Australia.  The site is currently bounded by Swanston Street, Collins Street, Flinders Lane and the Westin Hotel. The historic landmarks of Melbourne Town Hall and St Paul’s Cathedral are across the streets to the north and south respectively. The square has been redeveloped several times and associated with a number of controversies over the years.

The square closed on 3 April 2017 in preparation for the construction of Town Hall railway station, and was demolished later that year.

Background
The Melbourne CBD was originally laid out by Robert Hoddle in 1837 as a rectangular grid of 8 X 4 city blocks, with open space reserved around the edges. Like most other early Australian town layouts it lacked any kind of civic or open space within the grid, but reserved blocks or allotments for markets, public buildings, and churches. This lack of any public space or sweeping boulevards was criticised as early as 1850, and proposals for public squares within the grid cropped up regularly from the 1850s to the 1950s.

Council takes action  
When Sir Bernard Evans, architect and city councillor, was Lord Mayor of Melbourne in 1961, he was firmly of the view that a city square should be created between the Town Hall and the Cathedral, instead of a civic plaza with a new town hall on top of the rail yards opposite Flinders Street Station, or a space to the north or east of the Town Hall; but he could not convince his fellow Councillors.  In 1966, when the Queen Victoria Building on the corner of Swanston and Collins Street, and the adjacent City Club Hotel opposite the town hall, had been demolished by a developer pending future development, Council finally decided that it was a good site for the long debated City Square, and purchased the land. Then began the process of acquiring properties along Swanston Street between the Town Hall and St Paul’s Cathedral, and east up to an including the Regent Theatre. Buildings purchased included the Cathedral Hotel, Cathedral House, Guy's Buildings (demolished 1969), Green's Building and the Town Hall Chambers (demolished 1971) as well as Wentworth House and Regency House on Flinders Lane. After the Regent Theatre closed in 1970, Council bought that too, intending to demolish it for a larger square and a hotel tower to help fund the whole project, but it was saved by a union ban imposed in 1974.

By 1968 a temporary square of grass and paving was installed on the site of the Victoria Building and City Club Hotel, extended by the early 70s up to Flinders Lane, then east up to Regent Place. In February 1976 a performance by the band AC/DC was filmed there for a video clip for the single It's a Long Way to the Top (If You Wanna Rock 'n' Roll).  The video was filmed on the same day as the well-known version filmed on the back of a flatbed truck travelling down Swanston Street.

Permanent Square 
In 1976, an architectural competition was launched by Melbourne City Council to design a permanent square which was won by Denton Corker Marshall architects. The design, responding to the complex brief, included a giant video screen, restaurants, shops and outdoor cafes, connected by a glazed canopy, a sunken amphitheatre, graffiti wall, reflecting pool, water wall and cascades as well as the open area of the main square. Most of the elements and the large flat area were clad with sawn bluestone. The Burke and Wills Statue (1864) by Charles Summers, which had originally been at the intersection of Collins and Russell Streets, was positioned (somewhat ironically) on top of the cascades.

Following its opening by Queen Elizabeth II on 28 May 1980 the new square attracted criticism from the general public.  The Melbourne Age newspaper reported "in interviews with newspaper reporters and on talk-back radio, many Melburnians have blasted their long awaited City Square for what they see as its bareness, the noise from its controversial video matrix screen and the starkness of the glazed steel canopy running along the Regent Theatre Wall". A large yellow steel sculpture titled “Vault” by Ron Robertson-Swann (dubbed the "Yellow Peril") which was commissioned as a centrepiece for the square was relocated to Batman Park in July 1981, following heated public debate. In the following decade the square was increasingly seen as a failure.

Second Square 
In the mid 1990s the eastern half the square was sold to developer David Marriner for the development of the Westin Hotel, in a complex deal that saw the restoration of the Regent Theatre, to be managed by Marriner's company Staged Developments. The restored theatre reopened in 1996. Between 1997 and 2000 the remaining area of the square was redeveloped with a much simpler plan, with bars and cafes under the hotel, some seating and the large oak tree transplanted to the Collins Street corner, and a large flat area of granitic gravel intended for events, and a 450 space carpark underneath.  A long linear water feature by the glass artist Denise Sullivan along the east side, and a water wall known as the John Mockridge Fountain on Collins Street were installed, and plane trees lining the Swanston Street edge. A cast bronze statue of a small dog created by Melbourne artist Pamela Irving and titled Larry La Trobe was located in the north-west corner in 1992. The statue became widely known after its theft in 1995; following a long public campaign, a revamped version of the statue was recast and reinstalled in 1996. In 2003 raised grassed areas were added to soften the space and provide informal seating areas.

With the substantial reduction of its area and the opening of the nearby Federation Square soon after in 2002, the civic importance of the City Square was diminished.

In October 2011 Mayor Robert Doyle ordered an eviction of about 100 Occupy Melbourne protesters from the City Square, which was enforced by up to 400 riot police.

Current status 
In early 2016, as part of the construction of the Metro Tunnel, it was announced that the City Square would be acquired and demolished to allow for the construction of CBD South station, to be known as Town Hall Station. The businesses were evicted and the City Square itself was closed on 3 April 2017, and demolition of the square and the part of the car park structure under it began in late 2017. Draft designs for its eventual reconstruction show the square rebuilt much as it was, but with an entrance to the station occupying the north end.

References

Day N. (1976), "The Struggle to Build a City Square . . ." Architecture Australia, 65 (4) pp 22–39
The Age, Melbourne, 4 June 1980:3
Melbourne City Council - City Square

Squares in Melbourne
Buildings and structures in Melbourne City Centre
Tourist attractions in Melbourne
Landmarks in Melbourne